The United States Marine Hospital in Louisville, Kentucky, in the Portland neighborhood was built in 1845, and is considered by the National Park Service to be the best remaining antebellum hospital in the United States.  Of the seven hospitals built in the mid-19th century by the Marine Hospital Service "for the benefit of sick seamen, boatmen, and other navigators on the western rivers and lakes." It is the only one still standing, even after surviving two tornadoes. The building has been extensively restored to match its appearance in 1899.

History

The U.S. Marine Hospital opened in 1852. The patients at the Louisville Marine Hospital were usually victims of disease, temperature extremes, and mechanical deficiencies of the era's naval technology.  During the American Civil War, along with Jefferson General Hospital, it formed the foundation of Louisville health care for wounded soldiers, both Union and captured Confederates.  It is believed that a third of the total patients were black.  During World War I the hospital cared for many amputees injured in the war.  During the 1930s, it served as housing for nurses and doctors of nearby hospitals. The hospital closed in 1933.

The city of Louisville purchased the building in 1950 for $25,000 and used it for a short time as a hospital for the chronically ill.

In the late 1950s, it housed medical residents working in the newer hospital directly behind it, which replaced the Marine Hospital and today is known as Family Health Center Portland. The building was vacant from 1976 until 2007. It was placed on the National Register of Historic Places in 1997.

Restoration

In 2003, the National Trust for Historic Preservation (NTHP) placed the building on its America's Most Endangered Places list, which helped spark public interest in restoring it. The hospital has now been returned to its 1899 appearance, the earliest reference of the building's appearance that can be found.  In 2003, the hospital received a $375,000 Save America's Treasures grant from the NTHP to repair its roof and exterior.  On November 11, 2005, rebuilding of the structure began.  The smokestack, constructed in 1933, was demolished to help return the structure to its 1899 appearance.  The octagonal cupola, which patients used to better view the passing river traffic during its heyday, was also rebuilt.

Small buildings that once housed a boiler and a parking structure were razed to reflect the original design.

The 28 sets of wrought iron railings lining the building's galleries were either restored or replaced by the same Covington, Kentucky-based iron works company that created the original ones in 1850.

The hospital celebrated the completion of its exterior restoration phase with an open house on June 16, 2007

Future plans

Several plans have been devised to use the structure.  During Paul E. Patton's term as Kentucky governor, the hospital was considered as a welcome center for those entering Kentucky from the Sherman Minton Bridge.  Traffic projections stopped that plan from being implemented.

The basement, which formerly held boilers, is to be used as a  multi-use ballroom and rented out for parties and other special events. The building's ground floor is to be used as an interactive center featuring hospital history and artifacts.

The remaining two floors are slated for agencies and organizations specializing in improving community health within underserved urban communities.

Media reports have stated that the University of Louisville is close to signing a deal to put a Community Health Center in the historic building.

Architecture

The structure was strategically placed between the wharfs of Louisville and Portland, with a "beneficial effect of a view of the (Ohio River), and the impressions and associations it would naturally awake in the minds of men whose occupation were so intimately connected with it.".  It was designed by Robert Mills, who designed the Washington Monument and several other prominent structures.  It was a "cutting edge" facility, with indoor plumbing and an air circulation system that helped prevent infections.

See also
 Louisville in the American Civil War
 List of attractions and events in the Louisville metropolitan area

References

External links

 Official Site

Hospital buildings completed in 1845
Hospitals established in 1845
1845 establishments in Kentucky
1933 disestablishments in Kentucky
19th-century buildings and structures in Louisville, Kentucky
Louisville, Kentucky, in the American Civil War
Tourist attractions in Louisville, Kentucky
Local landmarks in Louisville, Kentucky
National Register of Historic Places in Louisville, Kentucky
National Historic Landmarks in Kentucky
American Civil War hospitals
Kentucky in the American Civil War
Defunct hospitals in Kentucky
Lousiville
Hospital buildings on the National Register of Historic Places in Kentucky